The Green Pond, Walterboro and Branchville Railroad was formed in 1900 by the merger of Green Pond, Walterboro and Branchville Railway with the Walterboro and Western Railway.

In 1901, the Green Pond, Walterboro and Branchville Railroad was consolidated, along with the Ashley River Railroad; the Abbeville Southern Railway; and Southern Alabama Railroad, into the Savannah, Florida and Western Railway.

In 1902 the Atlantic Coast Line Railroad acquired the Savannah, Florida and Western.

References

Defunct South Carolina railroads
Railway companies established in 1900
Railway companies disestablished in 1901
Predecessors of the Atlantic Coast Line Railroad
American companies established in 1900
1900 establishments in South Carolina
1901 disestablishments in South Carolina